Leo Eric Varadkar (born 18 January 1979) is an Irish politician who has served as Taoiseach since December 2022, and previously from 2017 to 2020. He served as Tánaiste and Minister for Enterprise, Trade and Employment from June 2020 to December 2022. He has been Leader of Fine Gael since June 2017, and a Teachta Dála (TD) for the Dublin West constituency since 2007. He previously served under Taoiseach Enda Kenny as Minister for Social Protection from 2016 to 2017, Minister for Health from 2014 to 2016 and Minister for Transport, Tourism and Sport from 2011 to 2014.

Varadkar was born in Dublin and studied medicine at Trinity College Dublin. He spent several years as a non-consultant hospital doctor, eventually qualifying as a general practitioner in 2010. In 2004, he joined Fine Gael and became a member of Fingal County Council and later served as Deputy Mayor of Fingal. He was elected to Dáil Éireann for the first time in 2007. During the campaign for the 2015 same-sex marriage referendum, Varadkar came out as gay, becoming the first serving Irish minister to do so.

In May 2017, Taoiseach Enda Kenny announced that he would resign as Taoiseach and Fine Gael leader. Varadkar stood in the leadership election to replace him; although more party members voted for his opponent, Simon Coveney, he won by a significant margin among Fine Gael members of the Oireachtas, and was elected leader on 2 June. Twelve days later, he was appointed Taoiseach, and at 38 years of age became the youngest person to hold the office. He is Ireland's first, and the world's fifth, openly gay head of government and the first Taoiseach to be from an ethnic minority in Ireland.

In 2020, Varadkar called a general election held in February. While polls in 2019 had suggested a favourable result for Fine Gael, they ultimately came third in terms of seats and votes, behind Fianna Fáil and Sinn Féin, with 35 seats, a loss of 15 seats for the party from the previous general election, when it had come in first position. As part of an agreement to form a three-party coalition along with Fianna Fáil and the Green Party, Varadkar resigned as Taoiseach and was succeeded by Micheál Martin, the leader of Fianna Fáil. Varadkar was subsequently appointed Tánaiste and Minister for Enterprise, Trade and Employment. Per the same agreement, Varadkar returned as Taoiseach in December 2022, with Martin being appointed Tánaiste.

Early life
Born on 18 January 1979, in the Rotunda Hospital, Dublin, Varadkar is the third child and only son of Ashok and Miriam (née Howell) Varadkar. His father was born in Bombay (now Mumbai), India, and moved to the United Kingdom in the 1960s, to work as a doctor. His mother, born in Dungarvan, County Waterford, met her future husband while working as a nurse in Slough. Early in 1971, they married in the UK. Sophie, the elder of his two sisters, was born while the family lived in Leicester. They moved to India, before settling in Dublin in 1973, where his other sister, Sonia, was born.

Varadkar was educated at the St Francis Xavier national school in Blanchardstown and then The King's Hospital, a Church of Ireland secondary school in Palmerstown. At the age of 16, he joined Young Fine Gael. He was admitted to Trinity College Dublin (TCD), where he briefly read law before switching to its School of Medicine. At TCD, he was active in the university's Young Fine Gael branch and served as Vice-President of the Youth of the European People's Party, the youth wing of the European People's Party, of which Fine Gael is a member. Varadkar was selected for the Washington Ireland Program for Service and Leadership (WIP), a half-year personal and professional development program in Washington, D.C., for students from Ireland.

He graduated in 2003, after completing his internship at KEM Hospital in Mumbai. He then spent several years working as a non-consultant hospital doctor in St. James's Hospital and Connolly Hospital, before specialising as a general practitioner in 2010.

Early political career

Fingal County Council (2003–2007)
Varadkar was twenty years old and a second-year medical student when he unsuccessfully contested the 1999 local elections in the Mulhuddart local electoral area. Varadkar was co-opted to Fingal County Council in 2003, for the Castleknock local electoral area, as a replacement for Sheila Terry. At the 2004 local elections, he received the highest first-preference vote in the country with 4,894 votes and was elected on the first count.

Dáil Éireann (2007–2011)
Varadkar was elected to Dáil Éireann at the 2007 general election as a Fine Gael TD for the Dublin West constituency. During the 2002 Fine Gael leadership election, then Leader of the Opposition, Enda Kenny, appointed him to the Front Bench as Spokesperson for Enterprise, Trade and Employment until a 2010 reshuffle, when he became Spokesperson on Communications, Energy and Natural Resources. It was also during 2010 that Varadkar was reported to be a supporter of an attempt to oust Enda Kenny as leader of Fine Gael and replace him with Richard Bruton. The heave was not successful, but in the aftermath, Varadkar was able to repair his relationship with Kenny. At the 2011 general election, Varadkar was re-elected to Dáil Éireann, with 8,359 first-preference votes (a 19.7% share of the poll in a four-seat constituency).

Government minister

Minister for Transport, Tourism, and Sport (2011–2014)
When Fine Gael formed a coalition government with the Labour Party, Varadkar was appointed Minister for Transport, Tourism and Sport on 9 March 2011. This appointment was considered a surprise, as Varadkar was not known as a sports lover. He said that while he knew "a lot of facts ... I don't play the sports."

In May 2011, Varadkar suggested Ireland was "very unlikely" to resume borrowing in 2012 and might need a second bailout, causing jitters on international markets about Ireland's credibility. Many of his cabinet colleagues frowned on Varadkar's forthrightness, as did the European Central Bank. Taoiseach Enda Kenny repeated the line of the Government of Ireland, that the State would not require a further bailout from the European Union or the International Monetary Fund, and said he had warned all ministers against publicly disparaging the economy. Varadkar said that reaction to the story was hyped up but that he was not misquoted. The Evening Herald repeatedly described Varadkar as gaffe prone.

Minister for Health (2014–2016)

In the cabinet reshuffle of July 2014, Varadkar replaced James Reilly as Minister for Health.

He was returned to the Dáil at the 2016 general election. He retained the health portfolio in an acting capacity until May that year, due to the delay in government formation. In one of his final acts as Minister for Health, Varadkar cut €12 million from the €35 million allocated to that year's budget for mental health care, telling the Dáil that the cuts were "necessary as the funding could be better used elsewhere."

Minister for Social Protection (2016–2017)
On 6 May 2016, after government formation talks had concluded, Taoiseach Enda Kenny appointed Varadkar as Minister for Social Protection. During his time in the ministry, he launched a campaign against welfare fraud.

Taoiseach (2017–2020)

2017

On 2 June 2017, Varadkar was elected leader of Fine Gael, defeating Simon Coveney. Although Coveney had the support of more Fine Gael members than Varadkar, the electoral college system more strongly weighted the votes of the party's parliamentarians, with these strongly backing Varadkar.

Like Enda Kenny's second term, Varadkar relied upon the support of Independents and the abstention of Fianna Fáil TDs to support his bid for Taoiseach. On 14 June 2017, he was elected as Taoiseach in a 57–50 vote with 47 abstentions. He became Ireland's first openly gay Taoiseach, as well as the youngest; however, he is not the youngest head of an Irish government, as both Éamon de Valera and Michael Collins were younger on assuming their respective offices in revolutionary governments prior to the establishment of the state. He is also the first head of government who is of half-Indian descent. It was also the first time that one Fine Gael Taoiseach was succeeded by another.

One of Varadkar's first acts as Taoiseach was to announce a referendum on abortion for 2018. He said that the government would also lay out a road map for achieving a low carbon economy.

His government nearly collapsed as a result of the Garda whistleblower scandal and Tánaiste (Deputy Prime Minister) Frances Fitzgerald's role in it. Fianna Fáil, the main opposition party, who were in a confidence-and-supply agreement with Fine Gael, threatened a motion of no confidence in the government. After days of gridlock, the crisis was averted, after Fitzgerald resigned from the cabinet to prevent triggering an election that could jeopardise the Irish position in Brexit negotiations. Shortly after this, Varadkar appointed former leadership rival and Minister for Foreign Affairs and Trade Simon Coveney as Tánaiste, Heather Humphreys as Minister for Business, Enterprise and Innovation and Josepha Madigan as Minister for Culture, Heritage and the Gaeltacht, in a small reshuffle of the cabinet.

Shortly after the Fitzgerald crisis, an impasse was reached in the Brexit talks, as Arlene Foster, leader of the Democratic Unionist Party, objected to a deal agreed to by Varadkar, British Prime Minister Theresa May, and President of the European Commission Jean-Claude Juncker. This prevented an agreement from being reached as the deadline approached. Varadkar stated he was "surprised and disappointed" the UK could not reach a deal. Later in the week, a consensus deal was finalised. Varadkar stated he had received guarantees from the UK there would be no hard border between Ireland and Northern Ireland. He later said he and his cabinet had "achieved all we set out to achieve" during the talks before quoting former British Prime Minister Winston Churchill, by saying "This is not the end but it is the end of the beginning". An Irish Times poll taken during these days showed Varadkar with a 53% approval rating, the highest for any Taoiseach since 2011, and showed Fine Gael with an eleven-point lead over Fianna Fáil. Government satisfaction was also at 41%, the highest in almost 10 years. Irish Times columnist Pat Leahy claimed Varadkar had ended 2017 "on a high" and IrishCentral called it the Taoiseach's "finest hour".

2018
In January 2018, his opinion poll approval ratings reached 60%, a ten-year high for any Taoiseach.

In January 2018, he announced that the referendum to repeal Ireland's 8th Amendment which prevented any liberalisation of restrictive abortion laws would take place in May. If passed, it would allow the government to introduce new legislation. It was proposed that women would be allowed unrestricted access to abortion up until 12 weeks, with exceptions if the mother's life is in danger up until six months. Varadkar said he would campaign for liberalising the laws, saying his mind was changed by difficult cases during his tenure as Minister for Health. The referendum passed with 66% of the votes.

Varadkar was included in Time magazine's 100 Most Influential People of 2018.

2019

On 24 January 2019, Varadkar said in an interview with Euronews he was standing firm on the Irish backstop and called Brexit an act of self-harm that was not fully thought through. He also said the technology promised by the Brexiteers to solve the Northern Ireland border issue "doesn't yet exist".

Varadkar stated he will refuse to ratify the EU–Mercosur free trade agreement unless Brazil commits to protecting the environment. The fear is that the deal could lead to more deforestation of the Amazon rainforest as it expands market access to Brazilian beef.

2020

On 14 January 2020, Varadkar sought a dissolution of the 32nd Dáil, which was granted by President Michael D. Higgins, and scheduled a general election for 8 February. In that election, Varadkar was re-elected in the Dublin West constituency, but Fine Gael fell to 35 seats, 15 fewer than in 2016, and falling to third place behind Fianna Fáil (38 seats) and Sinn Féin (37 seats). Varadkar ruled out any possibility of a Fine Gael–Sinn Féin coalition during the election campaign, though a "grand coalition" of Fianna Fáil and Fine Gael was floated as a final possibility. However, on 12 February, Varadkar conceded that Fine Gael had lost the election and that he was very likely to become the next Opposition Leader. Varadkar added that Fine Gael was "willing to step back" to allow Sinn Féin, as the winner of the popular vote, to have the first opportunity to form a government. On 20 February, Varadkar offered his resignation to President Higgins at Áras an Uachtaráin, pursuant to the constitution, remaining, however, as Taoiseach until the formation of a new government.

During this period, the COVID-19 pandemic arrived in Ireland. While in Washington, D.C., ahead of Saint Patrick's Day, Varadkar announced measures intended to stop COVID-19 spreading, including the closure of all schools, universities and childcare facilities from the following day, as well as the closure of all cultural institutions and the cancellation of "all indoor mass gatherings of more than 100 people and outdoor mass gatherings of more than 500 people". After returning home early, Varadkar addressed the nation on Saint Patrick's night during A Ministerial Broadcast by An Taoiseach Leo Varadkar, TD, introducing television viewers to the concept of "cocooning", i.e. "At a certain point… we will advise the elderly and people who have a long-term illness to stay at home for several weeks". The speech was the most watched television event in Irish history, surpassing the previous record held by The Late Late Toy Show by an additional total of about 25% and was widely distributed globally. It was also plagiarised by Irish businessman Peter Bellew, the chief operating officer at British low-cost airline group EasyJet.

In response to a March 2020 Health Service Executive appeal to healthcare professionals, Varadkar rejoined the medical register and offered to work as a doctor one day each week.

Three-party coalition

Tánaiste and Minister for Enterprise, Trade and Employment (2020–2022)

On 26 June 2020, it was announced that Fine Gael, Fianna Fáil, and the Green Party had agreed to form a coalition government, marking the first time the two Irish parties had formed a government together, including a rotation agreement in the offices of Taoiseach and Tánaiste. Fianna Fáil leader Micheál Martin was appointed Taoiseach on 27 June, with Varadkar appointed as Tánaiste and Minister for Enterprise, Trade and Employment. It was agreed then that they would exchange positions in December 2022, with Varadkar retaking the position of Taoiseach for the remainder of the coalition's term.

GP contract leak
On 31 October 2020, Village published an article alleging that Varadkar had leaked confidential documents, including a draft contract between the Health Service Executive and general practitioners that was agreed but still subject to acceptance by GPs at the time, and officially unavailable to members of the Oireachtas. The article included screenshots of WhatsApp messages, including one with a photo of the cover of the leaked document, and alleged the handwriting visible was Varadkar's. While Village claimed the leaks might be unlawful, Varadkar denied this was the case and described the article as "inaccurate and grossly defamatory". He said that the provision of the agreement by an informal communication channel was not best practice.

In response to the claims by Village, the Green Party called for Varadkar to give a detailed account to the Dáil in response to the accusations. This request was seconded by Sinn Féin's health spokesperson, stating: "The facts for me here are clear – Leo, as the leader of Fine Gael and Taoiseach at the time, passed on a document to a friend about sensitive negotiations involving hundreds of millions of euro of taxpayers' money." Varadkar's Fine Gael colleague Paschal Donohoe also expressed a desire for Varadkar to answer questions in the Dáil. Varadkar apologised in the Dáil for "errors of judgement" in sharing a copy of the contract, and rejected any suggestion that he had anything to gain personally from giving the IMO document to the NAGP president as "false and deeply offensive".
The leak was the subject of a criminal investigation. In April 2022, a file was submitted to the Director of Public Prosecutions (DPP) for review. On 6 July 2022, the DPP decided that Varadkar would not face prosecution.

Taoiseach (2022–present)

On 17 December 2022, Varadkar was appointed as Taoiseach for a second time, replacing Micheál Martin.

Political views and profile
After becoming a Teachta Dála in 2007, Varadkar developed a reputation in the late 2000s and early 2010s as somewhat of an outspoken maverick. Just one week into his role as a TD, Varadkar branded sitting Taoiseach Bertie Ahern "cunning and devious" in the Dáil. In 2011, he upset a number of his own party colleagues when he negatively compared embattled Fianna Fáil leader and Taoiseach Brian Cowen to former Fine Gael leader and Taoiseach Garret Fitzgerald. By 2012, Varadkar's tenacity to make "off the cuff" remarks lead to the Evening Herald describing him as "gaffe-prone". In 2017, Irish Times columnist Stephen Collins described Varadkar as "coming across to the public, especially younger voters, as if he is not a politician at all". In 2022, the New York Times noted that "critics have pointed to Mr. Varadkar's stiffness of manner and tendency to speak his mind, to the point of insensitivity".  

In 2010, the Irish Examiner described Varadkar as "conservative" while that same year the Irish magazine Hot Press described his policy positions as "radical right", although in the same article, he described himself as "centre-right", which he defined as "to be somebody who is right of centre is somebody who has broadly liberal-conservative/Christian-democrat ideals, and the basic principles of that is that before you can distribute wealth you have to create it. So the first thing that you need to do is set up an environment in which wealth can be created, and then it's the role of the government to distribute it reasonably equitably." In 2017, the Guardian stated that "Varadkar's centre-right politics are clearly conservative". In 2022, the political magazine the Phoenix suggested that in 2010 Varadkar was the ideological leader of a "hard-right" faction within Fine Gael who unsuccessfully sought to replace leader Enda Kenny with Richard Bruton, but over the course of the next decade Varadkar was brought further and further into the political centre. 
 
In 2011, Varadkar cited Ryanair CEO Michael O'Leary as the Irish person he most admired due to his forthrightness, and Otto von Bismarck as a historic figure he admired, crediting Bismarck as a conservative who was able to enact social reforms. In 2021 Varadkar gave a dedicated lecture on Noël Browne to students of Trinity College Dublin, in which he summarised Browne's career. Varadkar noted Browne's cantankerous reputation but generally praised Browne, with Varadkar stating that he always "admired his idealism, his passion, and his determination to stand up for the causes and the people he believed in".

Economy
Varadkar is a proponent of tax cuts and welfare reform,  and is a supporter of investment in Ireland by multinational corporations such as Apple Inc, alongside keeping Ireland's corporate tax rate low. During his time as Minister for Social Protection in 2016 and 2017, Varadkar launched the "Welfare Cheats Cheat Us All" campaign, aimed at those committing welfare fraud.

Foreign policy

Varadkar, alongside his party Fine Gael, universally opposed Brexit, and much of his time during his first tenure as Taoiseach was spent in negotiations with the British government over how the shared border between the United Kingdom and Ireland would operate.  

Varadkar is a supporter of CETA, a proposed free trade agreement between Canada and the European Union. However, Varadkar has faced opposition to many aspects of the agreement, not just from opposition parties, but also members of his own government coalition, especially members of the Green party who object in particular to a proposed "investment court" system. Critics of the agreement fear the investment court could be used to strike down environmentalist laws.

LGBT issues
In a 2010 interview, Varadkar stated that while he did not consider homosexuality morally wrong, he opposed gay marriage, although supported civil partnerships. However, following his public acknowledgement in January 2015 that he was a gay man, Varadkar began advocating for gay marriage during the national debate in the prelude to the 2015 referendum on gay marriage. 

In 2022 Varadkar stated he was in support of the transgender community, and credited a gender recognition legislation brought into law during the Fine Gael/Labour government of 2011 to 2016 as a "huge step forward" in Ireland in terms of trans issues.

Abortion
In 2010 Varadkar stated flatly that he opposed abortion,  that he was not in favour of introducing new legislation on abortion,  and that he opposed abortion in cases of rape because he felt it would lead to "abortion on demand". However, by 2014, Varadkar had changed his position and began arguing in the Dáil in favour of abortion up to 12 weeks, and more if the mother's life was in danger. During the national debate that occurred before the referendum on abortion in 2018, Varadkar said that there had been a "fundamental shift" in his views on abortion over the years, and repudiated what he had said in 2010.

Immigration
In 2010, Varadkar was an advocate of a scheme in which immigrants to Ireland would be paid to return to their country of origin. Varadkar suggested that at the time of the Nice Treaty referendums in Ireland in the early 2000s, the public were told there would not be large-scale immigration to Ireland in the aftermath, but this was not the case, before further suggesting that Ireland had not been suitably prepared for the amount of immigration it experienced during the Celtic Tiger period.  

In a 2022 interview, Varadkar was critical of British politicians Priti Patel and Jeremy Corbyn, stating he felt they both had anti-immigration views he found distasteful, but in particular, criticised Patel's handling of Rwandan refugees in her role as Home Secretary. In the same interview, Varadkar stated "I have always been supportive of migration" and "supportive of accepting refugees from war-torn countries", although he said he made the distinction between "people who come here legally and contribute to our society, and those who come here illegally and seek to gain status through subterfuge or falsehood". In June 2022, Varadkar personally began hosting a Ukrainian refugee in his home.

In January 2023, Varadkar announced that his government would be looking at ways to strengthen border control against illegal immigration.

Personal life
Varadkar is the first Irish government leader of partly Indian origin and has visited India on a number of occasions. He completed his medical internship at KEM Hospital in his father's childhood city of Mumbai.

During an interview on RTÉ Radio on 18 January 2015 (his 36th birthday), Varadkar spoke publicly for the first time about being gay: "it's not something that defines me. I'm not a half-Indian politician, or a doctor politician or a gay politician for that matter. It's just part of who I am, it doesn't define me, it is part of my character I suppose". Varadkar was a prominent advocate of the same-sex marriage referendum. His partner, Matthew Barrett, is a doctor at Mater Misericordiae University Hospital.

In 2017, Varadkar completed a course in professional Irish, and devised an Irish language form for his surname, de Varad. He has said, "My philosophy towards Irish is just to speak it! Speak Irish! It's not about getting it perfect – it's about having fun and making an effort to speak it."

See also
List of openly LGBT heads of government

Notes

References

External links

Leo Varadkar's page on the Fine Gael website

 

|-

|-

|-

|-

|-

1979 births
Living people
Alumni of Trinity College Dublin
Fine Gael TDs
Gay politicians
Irish people of Indian descent
LGBT conservatism
LGBT heads of government
LGBT history in Ireland
LGBT legislators in Ireland
Irish LGBT rights activists
Local councillors in Fingal
Members of the 30th Dáil
Members of the 31st Dáil
Members of the 32nd Dáil
Members of the 33rd Dáil
Ministers for Defence (Ireland)
Ministers for Health (Ireland)
Ministers for Social Affairs (Ireland)
Ministers for Transport (Ireland)
People educated at The King's Hospital
Politicians from Fingal
Politicians of Indian descent
Taoisigh
21st-century Irish medical doctors
Young Fine Gael
Tánaistí
Ministers for Enterprise, Trade and Employment